Bracklyn was a British steam fishing trawler. Completed in 1914, it was almost immediately requisitioned as a minesweeper by the Royal Navy to take part in the First World War. It ran aground at Great Yarmouth in 1916, but was towed off and re-floated by a tug. In May 1917, the ship was mined by a U-boat and sank, killing the crew.

Construction and design
Bracklyn (Official Number 13688), a steel fishing trawler, was constructed in Aberdeen by J. Duthie Torry Shipbuilding Co. for The Brooklyn Fishing Company Ltd., Fleetwood. Bracklyn was launched on 22 April 1914 and was completed a month later in May, being registered by her owners in Fleetwood on 28 May 1914.

History

First World War service
In December 1914, seven months after her registration, Bracklyn was requisitioned by the Royal Navy for service in the First World War, becoming a minesweeper. On 28 March 1916, the warship and four other civilian ships ran aground on Corton Beach, Great Yarmouth during a period of bad weather. When the weather cleared, Bracklyn was towed off the beach by the tug Lowestoft, assisted by the lifeboat Kentwell. The following year, on 11 May 1917, Bracklyn sank at  after striking a mine laid by  three days earlier. The entire crew of ten were killed in action.

References

1914 ships
Trawlers
Naval trawlers of the United Kingdom
Steamships of the United Kingdom
World War I minesweepers of the United Kingdom
Maritime incidents in 1917
Ships sunk by German submarines in World War I
Ships sunk by mines
World War I shipwrecks in the North Sea
Ships lost with all hands